Makuburi is an administrative ward in the Ubungo District  of the Dar es Salaam Region of Tanzania. In 2016 the Tanzania National Bureau of Statistics report there were 71,888 people in the ward, from 57,408 in 2012.

References

Kinondoni District
Wards of Dar es Salaam Region